Hogue is a surname common to France, England and Scotland.  Hogue is a Norman-French topographic name derived from the Old Norman word hogue, itself from Old Norse haugr meaning hill or mound and appears as a habitational name for locations in Seine-Maritime, Calvados, Eure, and Manche  in Normandy as well as in the Channel Islands. 

Hogue may refer to:

People

Alexandre Hogue (1898–1994), American artist
Benoît Hogue (born 1966), Canadian ice hockey player
Bob Hogue (born 1953), American politician, author, columnist and sportscaster
Bobby Hogue (1921–1987), American Major League Baseball player
Bobby Hogue (politician) (1939-2023), American politician
Cal Hogue (1927–2005), American baseball player
James Hogue (born 1959), American con man
Jean-Pierre Hogue (1927–2012), Member of the Canadian House of Commons
Jeffrey C. Hogue, American businessman, owner of Charles Atlas Ltd.
Michael Hogue (born 1975), Australian former rugby player
Oliver Hogue (1880–1919), Australian soldier, journalist, and poet
Paul Hogue (1940–2009), American basketball player
Russ Hogue (born 1974), American kickboxer
Shorty Hogue (fl. 1940s), American boxer 
Tien Hogue, Anne Christina Hogue (1892-1964), Australian actress of stage and screen in the silent era
Wilson Thomas Hogue (1852–1920), American bishop of the Free Methodist Church

Places
Hogue Creek, a stream in Virginia
Hogue Town, Illinois, an unincorporated community
Les Hogues, a commune in the Eure department in Normandy, France

Other uses
HMS Hogue, three Royal Navy ships
Hogue (company), American manufacturer of firearm accessories and related products

See also
Battles of Barfleur and La Hougue, a naval engagement in the Nine Years' War
Hoag (disambiguation)